Embrace the Eternal is the debut album by the Christian metal band, Embodyment. Coming three years after their primarily death metal demos, the album blends their original death metal style with metalcore sounds. The lyrics speak to their Christian beliefs, focusing on Christ's Crucifixion, Christian troubles and doubts in faith.

Track listing

Personnel
Adapted from AllMusic.

Embodyment
 Kris McCaddon – Vocals
 Mark Garza – Drums
 Andrew Godwin – Lead Guitar, Lyrics
 James Lanigan – Rhythm Guitar
 Kevin Donnini – Bass

Additional Musicians
 Bruce Fitzhugh – Guest Vocals on track 5

Production
 Barry Poynter – Engineer, Mixing, Recording
 Brian Grundman – Mastering
 Jason Parker – Art Direction, Concept, Layout, Photography
 Brandon Ebel – Executive Producer

References

Solid State Records albums
1998 debut albums
Embodyment albums